Faruk Bayar (born October 11, 1981 in Eskişehir) is a Turkish retired footballer. He played left back, left midfield and defensive midfield. Standing at 178 cm, he wore the number 26 jersey. He became professional in 1999–2000 season at Eskişehirspor.

He has played for the Turkey under-21 team and 1 time for Turkey national football team.
He has previously played for Eskişehirspor (1999–2002), İstanbulspor (2002–2005), Gaziantepspor (2005–2007), Kasımpaşa S.K. (2007–2008), Sivasspor (2008–2010) and Mersin İdman Yurdu (2010–2011).

External links 
 Guardian Stats Centre

References 

1981 births
Living people
Turkish footballers
Turkey under-21 international footballers
Turkey international footballers
Eskişehirspor footballers
İstanbulspor footballers
Gaziantepspor footballers
Kasımpaşa S.K. footballers
Sivasspor footballers
Mersin İdman Yurdu footballers
TKİ Tavşanlı Linyitspor footballers
Association football defenders
21st-century Turkish people